Thaiyalkaran is a 1991 Indian Tamil-language drama film directed by S. P. Muthuraman, written by Mahendran and produced by Kalaipuli S. Thanu. The film stars R. Parthiban, Aishwarya, Saikumar Pudipeddi, Sreeja and Charmila, with Muralikumar, Chokkalinga Bhagavathar, Vasu Vikram, Dubbing Janaki and Ganeshkar in supporting roles. It was released on 14 January 1991.

Plot 

Pandian is a poor tailor, he is a fearless and smart man. He is appreciated by most of the villagers for his bravery. Kaveri is in love with Pandian but Pandian has no feelings for her. Kaveri is the sister of Jayabal, a wealthy rowdy who controls the fish market. Later, Pandian saves many people. He first saves a woman who has been beaten by her alcoholic son. He then saves an old man who was a famous singer in the past, now he suffers from poverty. He then rescues a young girl Lakshmi who was kidnapped by pimps. He then protects a jobless youngster Gopi from drug dealers. Pandian accommodates them in his house. To feed them, Pandian starts working day and night. What transpires next forms the rest of the story.

Cast 

R. Parthiban as Pandian
Aishwarya as Kaveri
Saikumar Pudipeddi as Jayabal
Sreeja as Omana
Charmila as Lakshmi
Muralikumar as Inspector Sukumar
Chokkalinga Bhagavathar as Chokkalinga Bhagavathar
Vasu Vikram as Gopi
Dubbing Janaki
Ganeshkar as Khaja
Thyagu
M. R. Krishnamurthy as Nayar
Manohar
Suryakanth
Savithri
Anushya
Hema
Ajay Rathnam in a guest appearance

Soundtrack 
The music was composed by S. P. Balasubrahmanyam, with lyrics written by Vaali.

Reception
Sundarji of Kalki said Muthuraman had tried something different, but by forcing many things like love, action and drama, it felt bored watching like a slow moving film from the 1970s. N. Krishnaswamy of The Indian Express wrote, "Parthiban seems to have worked on histrionics. TS Vinayagam handles the camera capably for director SP Muthuraman".

References

External links 
 

1990s Tamil-language films
1991 drama films
1991 films
Films directed by S. P. Muthuraman
Films scored by S. P. Balasubrahmanyam
Films with screenplays by Mahendran (filmmaker)
Indian drama films